Mark Damon Pieri (born September 25, 1970) is a former American football defensive back who played three seasons in the National Football League with the New York Jets and Carolina Panthers. He played college football at San Diego State University and attended St. Mary's High School in Phoenix, Arizona.

References

Living people
1970 births
Players of American football from Phoenix, Arizona
American football defensive backs
San Diego State Aztecs football players
New York Jets players
Carolina Panthers players